F.CUZ ("Focus"), is a South Korean boy band that used to be managed by Tunes-Will Entertainment, and is now promoting as an independent group (before 2014 by CAN Entertainment). The group made their debut on January 8, 2010 with their first single, "Jiggy" on Music Bank.  F.Cuz originally debuted as a four-member group (Jinon, LeeU, Kan, and Yejun), but LeeU made his departure on August 23, 2011 to pursue a solo career.  F.Cuz promoted shortly as three-member group in Japan, but were joined by new members Daegeon and Raehyun in 2012.  Their contract with Tunes-Will expired in September 2016, and they are now independent. The official fanclub for F.Cuz is 'For U' and their color is Twinkle Light Silver. The meaning of the group is "A five-points star" as in five members that complete F.CUZ, and "U+U = F.CUZ+FORU" as in the group and their fans being one.

History

Pre-debut
Jinon, Raehyun, Kan, and Yejun all attended the Anyang High School of Arts in Anyang; Jinon was their senior while Raehyun, Kan, and Yejun were in the same graduating class.  While in Anyang, Jinon, Kan, and Yejun all participated in a dance team that had included famous K-Pop star Rain.  Out of all the F.Cuz members who attended school in Anyang, Jinon had one of the busier pre-debut careers.  In 2005, Jinon joined a project group named GM6, now known as Supernova, and began trainee activities.  However, Jinon withdrew before their debut and suffered major health issues as a result; he battled depression and several eating disorders.  Jinon also pursued acting and achieved some notoriety due to his similarities to Kwon Sang Woo.  In 2009, he appeared in Cinderella Man as a younger version of Kwon Sang Woo's character.  Jinon also had a role in SG Wannabe's "Gashiri" music video alongside T-ara's Eunjung.

Like Jinon, Raehyun and Kan also pursued acting.  Raehyun's pre-debut career includes several dramas (Gloria, Over the Rainbow, Chosun Police (Season 3), Beautiful Life, and Rock, Rock, Rock), an appearance in the movie See You After School, and a Samyang ramen CF.  Kan appeared in the dramas Soul and Assorted Gems.

LeeU had always been a witness to the music industry due to his father, the famous trot singer Sul Woon Do.  From an early age, LeeU had wanted to pursue a singing career; so much so that he lost sixty pounds in one month during his first year of junior high.  Later, LeeU became a successful ulzzang and appeared on many variety programs with his father.  LeeU also had a short solo career under the name "U"; he appeared on the SBS Drama Gourmet OST with "Listen to You" and featured on a song with Taru called "오! 다시 (Oh! Again)."

Daegeon began his idol career under Xing Entertainment, a company most known for housing future members of U-KISS, Beast, and The Boss.  Daegeon eventually moved on to Golden Goose Entertainment and debuted as a member of Double B 21, now known as Apeace.  He participated in their S.O.S. promotions, but left the group shortly after.

2010: Jiggy, No One, overseas activities, and Gorgeous
F.Cuz was officially announced by CAN&J Entertainment on December 6, 2009.  Following the announcement, each day one member would introduce themselves to the public through a short video that showcased their talents; the videos amassed over 30,000 views.  In anticipation of their debut, F.Cuz began filming the music video for "Jiggy," their debut release, on December 15, 2009. "Jiggy" was digitally released on January 8, 2010 and they held their debut performance the same day on KBS' Music Bank.  In February, it was announced that F.Cuz had signed with Taiwanese label SEEDMUSIC to pursue activities overseas.  On March 8, "Jiggy" was digitally released in Taiwan and Hong Kong.  On March 11, 2010, F.Cuz made their Korean comeback with their first mini-album and title song "No One."

F.Cuz has come back with a new album called "Gorgeous" with the title track "Midnight Sun" on November 18, 2010. After eight months of hiatus, many fans were anticipating their comeback. Their single, "Midnight Sun" has become a huge hit and the group is earning more recognition. In order to prevent being labeled as a "failure group", F.Cuz released another single from their album, "친구졸업 (Friend's Graduation), renaming it as "Wanna Be Your Love". This song has a very cute and bubbly image that completely contradicts to the dark concept of "Midnight Sun" and F.Cuz is steadily gaining more popularity. Unfortunately, member Kan has recently been involved in a serious car accident after filming for the drama Athena: Goddess of War and going back to Seoul. He, his manager and four other people in the car received major and minor injuries after the car slipped on ice and crashed, forcing the group to halt activities for their new song.

2011–13: LeeU's withdrawal, For Century Ultimate Zest, Hello Again
On May 21, 2011, Can Entertainment announced that Lee-U would be leaving the group in August after releasing their Japanese debut single. The record company cited musical differences and to focus Lee-U's career as a solo singer. Can Entertainment and Lee-U's agency, Castle J Enterprise, came to an agreement to withdraw him from the group. The group will be adding 2 new members to replace Lee-U.

On April 27, 2012, F.Cuz released their new mini album "For Century Ultimate Zest." They made their comeback with promotions for the title track "NO. 1."

In August, they released "꿈꾸는" (Dreaming I), a single.

In April, F.Cuz returned to Japan with the single "Hello Again" along with a music video. On October 31, 2013, they released their 5th Japanese single, titled "Change". F.Cuz spent the rest of 2013 promoting in Japan.

2014–2016: One Love, Bargaining for Love , Two of Us, Contract Expiration and U Concert

F.Cuz released a Korean single titled "One Love" on March 27, 2014. This marked their Korean comeback after almost 2 years since they spent most of 2013 promoting in Japan. The group left to Japan in July to promote the Japanese version of "One Love", "Feeling My Soul".

F.Cuz then released its fourth mini-album titled Bargaining for Love with the title track "Cha-Ga-Wa". The former peaked at number 18 on the Gaon Album Chart.

In December 2014, F.Cuz released its seventh Japanese single "もう一度だけ" (Remind). On July 21, 2015, F.Cuz released their 8th Japanese single "Two of Us." It reached a peak of #3 on the Oricon chart on July 25.

On September 12, 2016, it was announced through F.Cuz's fan-club that the members would not renew their contracts once they expired on September 30, leading them into becoming an independent group.

In October 18, they changed their logo and the meaning behind it to "A five-points star" as in five members that complete F.CUZ, and "U+U = F.CUZ+FORU" as in the group and their fans being one.

In November 1, they announced their Japanese Concert called 'U', and have been actively promoting since then.

Members

Current 
 Jinon (진온)
 Kan (칸)
 Yejun (예준)
 Daegeon (대건)
 Raehyun (래현)

Former
 LeeU (이유)

Discography

Extended plays

Singles

Soundtrack appearances

Notes

References

External links
 

2010 establishments in South Korea
2016 disestablishments in South Korea
Japanese-language singers of South Korea
K-pop music groups
Mandarin-language singers of South Korea
Musical groups established in 2010
Musical groups disestablished in 2016
Musical groups from Seoul
South Korean boy bands
Universal Music Japan artists